Jonathan Marsden may refer to:

 Jonathan Marsden (art historian) (born 1960), English art historian
 Jonathan Marsden (cricketer) (born 1993), English cricketer